Marina Igorevna Sheshenina (born 26 June 1985 in Sverdlovsk) is a volleyball player from Russia, who plays as a setter. She was a member of the Women's National Team that won the gold medal at the 2006 FIVB Women's World Championship. She also competed at the 2004 Summer Olympics in Athens, Greece, claiming the silver medal.

Clubs
 Uralochka-NTMK (2006)

References

 FIVB Profile

1985 births
Living people
Russian women's volleyball players
Olympic volleyball players of Russia
Olympic silver medalists for Russia
Volleyball players at the 2004 Summer Olympics
Volleyball players at the 2008 Summer Olympics
Sportspeople from Yekaterinburg
Place of birth missing (living people)
Olympic medalists in volleyball
Medalists at the 2004 Summer Olympics
20th-century Russian women
21st-century Russian women